The Third World is an album by Argentinian jazz composer and saxophonist Gato Barbieri featuring performances recorded in 1969 and first released on the Flying Dutchman label.

Reception

The Allmusic site awarded the album 3 stars stating "The Third World is the initial session that mixed Gato Barbieri's free jazz tenor playing with Latin and Brazilian influences. ...creating a danceable yet fiery combination of South American rhythms and free jazz forcefulnes".

Track listing
 "Introduction/Cancion del Llamero/Tango" (Gato Barbieri/Anastasio Quiroga/Astor Piazzolla) – 11:04
 "Zelão" (Sérgio Ricardo) – 8:02
 "Antonio das Mortes" (Barbieri) – 9:26 
 "Bachianas Brasileiras/Haleo and the Wild Rose" (Heitor Villa-Lobos/Dollar Brand) – 10:58

Personnel
Gato Barbieri – tenor saxophone, flute, vocals
Roswell Rudd – trombone
Lonnie Liston Smith – piano
Charlie Haden – bass
Beaver Harris – drums
Richard Landrum – percussion

References

1969 albums
Albums produced by Bob Thiele
Flying Dutchman Records albums
Gato Barbieri albums